"Nos Fuimos Lejos" (Spanish: "We Went Away") is a song by Cuban singer Descemer Bueno and Spanish recording artist Enrique Iglesias, featuring collaborative vocals by El Micha. Written by Bueno, Iglesias, El Micha and Jorge Luis Piloto, it was digitally released on 6 April 2018 by Sony Music Entertainment. Several other versions of the singles were eventually released, including other artists—Andra, David Calzado y Su Charanga Habanera, Hatim Ammor and RedOne, Bebe, and Ece Seçkin. The original version of "Nos Fuimos Lejos" charted on several other Latin Billboard charts, while the "Romanian Version" with Andra reached the top 10 in Romania.

Release
"Nos Fuimos Lejos" was digitally released on 6 April 2018, as credited to Descemer Bueno and Enrique Iglesias featuring El Micha. Eventually, a "Romanian Version" of the single was premiered on 25 August 2018, listing Romanian singer Andra as a lead artist. On 4 September, El Micha was replaced as a featured artist by group David Calzado y Su Charanga Habanera for the release of a "Tropical Version". An "Arabic Version" was made available on 14 September, having Arabic singer Hatim Ammor as a lead artist and RedOne as a featured artist alongside El Micha. An "Acoustic Version" of the single was published on 19 April 2019, listing Bebe as a lead artist. Finally, a "Turkish Version" of the song was released on 7 June 2019, which had Turkish singer Ece Seçkin as a featured artist. All aforementioned releases were conducted by Sony Music Entertainment.

Music videos
An accompanying music video for "Nos Fuimos Lejos" was uploaded onto Iglesias's YouTube channel on 6 April 2018. Visuals were also released to all other versions of the song, featuring shots of the additional artists alongside the original video footage.

Track listing
Digital download
"Nos Fuimos Lejos" [featuring El Micha] – 3:29
"Nos Fuimos Lejos" (Romanian Version) [featuring El Micha] – 3:56
"Nos Fuimos Lejos" (Tropical Version) [featuring David Calzado y Su Charanga Habanera] – 4:48
"Nos Fuimos Lejos" (Arabic Version) [with Hatim Ammor featuring El Micha and RedOne] – 3:26
"Nos Fuimos Lejos" (Acoustic Version) [featuring Bebe] – 3:53
"Nos Fuimos Lejos" (Turkish Version) [featuring Ece Seçkin and El Micha] – 3:49

Charts

Weekly charts

Year-end charts

Certifications

Release history

References

2018 songs
2018 singles
Enrique Iglesias songs
Songs written by Descemer Bueno
Songs written by Enrique Iglesias
Songs written by Jorge Luis Piloto